Santa Rosa de Viterbo is a town and municipality in Boyacá Department, Colombia, part of the Tundama Province, a subregion of Boyacá.

Viterbite, not a mineral but a mixture of allophane and wavellite, occurs in and was named after this municipality.

History 
Santa Rosa de Viterbo was founded by the Spanish in 1689. Three priests petitioned the Archbishop of Santa Fe for resources to found the parish of Santa Rosa de Viterbo. A mayor was appointed in 1690; the first being José de los Reyes.

The "Aerolito" 
In the year 1810, a meteorite fell in Santa Rosa, and it was discovered by a farmer of the town. The mayor decided to place it in the middle of the town, in front of the church. A hundred years later, the president Rafael Reyes decided to take it to Bogotá. There it was divided in two big parts; one of the parts stayed in Bogotá, and the other is currently in a museum in Chicago.

Born in Santa Rosa de Viterbo 
 Rafael Reyes, former president of Colombia
 Fernando Soto Aparicio (1933), screenwriter, poet, and novelist
Juan José Reyes-Patria Escobar, Colombian politician and military leader

Further reading 
  (1949) "The meteorites of Santa Rosa de Viterbo, Colombia" Popular Astronomy, Vol. 57, p. 29

References

Municipalities of Boyacá Department
Populated places established in 1689
1689 establishments in the Spanish Empire